The  Tulsa Talons season was the 10th season for the franchise, and the first in the Arena Football League, coming from the AF2, which dissolved following the 2009 season. The team was coached by Mitch Allner and played their home games at BOK Center. Finishing first in the Southwest Division, the Talons were the only team from their division to make the playoffs, but lost 38–68 at home to the Tampa Bay Storm in the conference semifinals.

Standings

Regular season schedule
The Talons opened their season at home against the Storm on April 3. The conclusion of their regular season was on the road against the Yard Dawgz.

All times are EDT

Playoff schedule

All times are EDT

Roster

Regular season

Week 1: vs. Tampa Bay Storm

Neither team had consecutive scores until early in the 4th quarter when the Talons scored a touchdown early in the 4th quarter to give them a 56–37 lead. The Storm however came back with consecutive scores of their own to make it a five-point game. When the Talons scored a pair of touchdowns late in the 4th quarter, it was enough to seal the win in their first game of the year. Quarterback Justin Allgood and receiver Donovan Morgan accounted for the majority of Tulsa's offense. Allgood threw for 274 yards and 8 touchdowns, while Morgan had 120 yards receiving and caught 4 touchdowns.

Week 2: vs. Dallas Vigilantes

The Talons did not lead in the entire game until scoring the final points of the game. Down 59–48, quarterback Justin Allgood led the Talons to the end zone on their final two drives of the game, with both touchdowns scored by Allgood on short carries. The game winning score was set up by a forced fumble on Dallas quarterback Shane Stafford that was recovered by Jamar Ransom of the Talons at the Dallas 2-yard line. Allgood finished with only 10 completed passes in the entire game out of 23 attempts, but 5 of those completions were for touchdowns. In total, he threw for 182 yards. Donovan Morgan had 4 receptions for 112 yards and 3 touchdowns in the win.

Week 3: BYE

Week 4: at Arizona Rattlers

The Talons led the game 76–71 with no time remaining, but on an untimed down, Rod Windsor of the Rattlers was able to slip by the Tulsa defense one last time to score the game's winning touchdown. The Talons' Jeff Hughley recovered Tulsa's one fumble of the game and actually scored a touchdown on the play. Justin Allgood threw 10 touchdown passes, half of which went to Donovan Morgan.

Week 5: at Jacksonville Sharks

Week 6: vs. Alabama Vipers

The Talons extended their home winning streak to 13 games by defeating the Vipers 62–56, overcoming a 15-point deficit at halftime. Tied at 42–42 at the start of the 4th quarter, Tulsa had their first lead of the game when Jamar Ransom sacked Viper quarterback Kevin Eakin in the end zone for a safety. After the Talons received the free kick, Odie Armstrong ran 37 yards for a touchdown. Though the extra point was blocked the Talons now had a 50–42 advantage. Tulsa's defense stopped the Viper offense on the next drive, causing Alabama to turn the ball over on downs. With possession again, the Talons drove up the field for another touchdown, scored by Donovan Morgan on a 4-yard pass from Justin Allgood. The Vipers made it a 6-point game with 28 seconds left after a touchdown run, but their ensuing onside kick was recovered by Tulsa, who ran out the clock to preserve the win.

Allgood completed 23 of 31 passes for 244 yards and 7 touchdowns. Morgan had the most touchdown catches on the team with 4, but Carlese Franklin led in receiving yards with 110.

Week 7: at Cleveland Gladiators

Week 8: vs. Oklahoma City Yard Dawgz

Week 9: at Bossier–Shreveport Battle Wings

Week 10: vs. Orlando Predators

Week 11: at Dallas Vigilantes

Week 12: at Spokane Shock

Week 13: vs. Cleveland Gladiators

Week 14: BYE

Week 15: vs. Bossier–Shreveport Battle Wings

Week 16: at Alabama Vipers

With the win, the Talons clinched the Southwest Division.

Week 17: vs. Arizona Rattlers

Week 18: at Oklahoma City Yard Dawgz

Playoffs

American Conference Semifinals: vs. Tampa Bay Storm

References

Tulsa Talons
San Antonio Talons seasons